Gregorio Garavito Jiménez S.M.M. (March 9, 1919 – February 16, 2016) was a Colombian bishop of the Catholic Church. At the time of his death, he was one of oldest Colombian Catholic bishops.

Garavito was born in Junín, Colombia and was ordained a priest on July 24, 1942, from the religious order of Missionaries of the Company of Mary. Monsignor Garavito was appointed auxiliary bishop of the Archdiocese of Villavicencio as well as titular bishop of Cyparissia on December 4, 1961, and consecrated on February 11, 1962. He was appointed archbishop of the Archiocese of Villavicencio on April 26, 1969, and retired on May 3, 1994.

External links
Catholic-Hierarchy

1919 births
2016 deaths
20th-century Roman Catholic bishops in Colombia
Participants in the Second Vatican Council
Roman Catholic bishops of Villavicencio
Roman Catholic archbishops of Villavicencio